Von Willebrand factor (VWF) is a blood glycoprotein involved in hemostasis, specifically, platelet adhesion. It is deficient and/or defective in von Willebrand disease and is involved in many other diseases, including thrombotic thrombocytopenic purpura, Heyde's syndrome, and possibly hemolytic–uremic syndrome. Increased plasma levels in many cardiovascular, neoplastic, metabolic (e.g. diabetes), and connective tissue diseases are presumed to arise from adverse changes to the endothelium, and may predict an increased risk of thrombosis.

Biochemistry

Synthesis 
VWF is a large multimeric glycoprotein present in blood plasma and produced constitutively as ultra-large VWF in endothelium (in the Weibel–Palade bodies), megakaryocytes (α-granules of platelets), and subendothelial connective tissue.

Structure 
The basic VWF monomer is a 2050-amino acid protein. Every monomer contains a number of specific domains with a specific function; elements of note are:
 the D'/D3 domain, which binds to factor VIII (von Willebrand factor type D domain).
 the A1 domain, which binds to:
 platelet GPIb-receptor
 heparin
 possibly collagen
 the A2 domain, which must partially unfold to expose the buried cleavage site for the specific ADAMTS13 protease that inactivates VWF by making much smaller multimers.  The partial unfolding is affected by shear flow in the blood, by calcium binding, and by the lump of a sequence-adjacent "vicinal disulfide" at the A2-domain C-terminus.
 the A3 domain, which binds to collagen (von Willebrand factor type A domain)
 the C4 domain, in which the RGD motif binds to platelet integrin αIIbβ3 when this is activated (von Willebrand factor type C domain)
 the other C domains, which may interact in ER dimers: the larger protein show six beads of (C and C-like) domains under cryo-EM.
 the "cystine knot" domain (at the C-terminal end of the protein), which VWF shares with platelet-derived growth factor (PDGF), transforming growth factor-β (TGFβ) and β-human chorionic gonadotropin (βHCG, of pregnancy test fame). (von Willebrand factor type C domain)

Monomers are subsequently N-glycosylated, arranged into dimers in the endoplasmic reticulum and into multimers in the Golgi apparatus by crosslinking of cysteine residues via disulfide bonds. With respect to the glycosylation, VWF is one of only a few proteins that carry ABO blood group system antigens. VWFs coming out of the Golgi are packaged into storage organelles, Weibel-Palade bodies (WPBs) in endothelial cells and α-granules in platelets.

Multimers of VWF can be extremely large, >20,000 kDa, and consist of over 80 subunits of 250 kDa each. Only the large multimers are functional. Some cleavage products that result from VWF production are also secreted but probably serve no function.

Function 

Von Willebrand Factor's primary function is binding to other proteins, in particular factor VIII, and it is important in platelet adhesion to wound sites. It is not an enzyme and, thus, has no catalytic activity.

VWF binds to a number of cells and molecules. The most important ones are:
 Factor VIII is bound to VWF while inactive in circulation; factor VIII degrades rapidly when not bound to VWF. Factor VIII is released from VWF by the action of thrombin. In the absence of VWF, factor VIII has a half-life of 1–2 hours; when carried by intact VWF, factor VIII has a half-life of 8–12 hours.
 VWF binds to collagen, e.g., when collagen is exposed beneath endothelial cells due to damage occurring to the blood vessel. Endothelium also releases VWF which forms additional links between the platelets' glycoprotein Ib/IX/V and the collagen fibrils
 VWF binds to platelet gpIb when it forms a complex with gpIX and gpV; this binding occurs under all circumstances, but is most efficient under high shear stress (i.e., rapid blood flow in narrow blood vessels, see below).
 VWF binds to other platelet receptors when they are activated, e.g., by thrombin (i.e., when coagulation has been stimulated).

VWF plays a major role in blood coagulation. Therefore, VWF deficiency or dysfunction (von Willebrand disease) leads to a bleeding tendency, which is most apparent in tissues having high blood flow shear in narrow vessels. From studies it appears that VWF uncoils under these circumstances, decelerating passing platelets. Recent research also suggests that von Willebrand Factor is involved in the formation of blood vessels themselves, which would explain why some people with von Willebrand disease develop vascular malformations (predominantly in the digestive tract) that can bleed excessively.

Catabolism
The biological breakdown (catabolism) of VWF is largely mediated by the enzyme ADAMTS13 (acronym of "a disintegrin-like and metalloprotease with thrombospondin type 1 motif no. 13"). It is a metalloproteinase that cleaves VWF between tyrosine at position 842 and methionine at position 843 (or 1605–1606 of the gene) in the A2 domain. This breaks down the multimers into smaller units, which are degraded by other peptidases.

The half-life of vWF in human plasma is around 16 hours; glycosylation variation on vWF molecules from different individuals result in a larger range of 4.2 to 26 hours. Liver cells as well as macrophages take up vWF for clearance via ASGPRs and LRP1. SIGLEC5 and CLEC4M also recognize vWF.

Role in disease 

Hereditary or acquired defects of VWF lead to von Willebrand disease (vWD), a bleeding diathesis of the skin and mucous membranes, causing nosebleeds, menorrhagia, and gastrointestinal bleeding. The point at which the mutation occurs determines the severity of the bleeding diathesis. There are three types (I, II and III), and type II is further divided in several subtypes. Treatment depends on the nature of the abnormality and the severity of the symptoms. Most cases of vWD are hereditary, but abnormalities of VWF may be acquired; aortic valve stenosis, for instance, has been linked to vWD type IIA, causing gastrointestinal bleeding - an association known as Heyde's syndrome.

In thrombotic thrombocytopenic purpura (TTP) and hemolytic–uremic syndrome (HUS), ADAMTS13 either is deficient or has been inhibited by antibodies directed at the enzyme. This leads to decreased breakdown of the ultra-large multimers of VWF and microangiopathic hemolytic anemia with deposition of fibrin and platelets in small vessels, and capillary necrosis. In TTP, the organ most obviously affected is the brain; in HUS, the kidney.

Higher levels of VWF are more common among people that have had ischemic stroke (from blood-clotting) for the first time. Occurrence is not affected by ADAMTS13, and the only significant genetic factor is the person's blood group. High plasma VWF levels were found to be an independent predictor of major bleeding in anticoagulated atrial fibrillation patients.

History 

VWF is named after Erik Adolf von Willebrand, a Finnish physician who in 1926 first described a hereditary bleeding disorder in families from Åland. Although von Willebrand did not identify the definite cause, he distinguished von Willebrand disease (vWD) from hemophilia and other forms of bleeding diathesis.

In the 1950s, vWD was shown to be caused by a plasma factor deficiency (instead of being caused by platelet disorders), and, in the 1970s, the VWF protein was purified.
Harvey J. Weiss and coworkers developed a quantitative assay for VWF function that remains a mainstay of laboratory
evaluation for VWD to this day.

Interactions 

Von Willebrand Factor has been shown to interact with Collagen, type I, alpha 1.

Recently, It has been reported that the cooperation and interactions within the von Willebrand Factors enhances the adsorption probability in the primary haemostasis. Such cooperation is proven by calculating the adsorption probability of flowing VWF once it crosses another adsorbed one. Such cooperation is held within a wide range of shear rates.

See also 
 von Willebrand disease
 Bernard–Soulier syndrome

References

External links 
 GeneReviews/NCBI/NIH/UW entry on von Willebrand Factor Deficiency. Includes: Type 1 von Willebrand Disease, Type 2A von Willebrand Disease, Type 2B von Willebrand Disease, Type 2M von Willebrand Disease, Type 2N von Willebrand Disease, Type 3 von Willebrand Disease
 

Blood proteins
Coagulation system
Glycoproteins